Flight 703 may refer to:

LOT Polish Airlines Flight 703, crash-landed on 2 November 1988
Ansett New Zealand Flight 703, crashed on 9 June 1995
Lao Aviation Flight 703, crashed on 19 October 2000
Saratov Airlines Flight 703, crashed on 11 February 2018

0703